Jovana Vesović (born 21 June 1987) is a Serbian volleyball player who competed in the 2008 and 2012 Summer Olympics.

In 2008, she was eliminated with the Serbian team in the quarter-finals of the Olympic tournament.  In 2012, Serbia did not qualify from the group stage.

External links
 
 

1987 births
Living people
Sportspeople from Užice
Serbian women's volleyball players
Olympic volleyball players of Serbia
Olympiacos Women's Volleyball players
Volleyball players at the 2008 Summer Olympics
Volleyball players at the 2012 Summer Olympics
Serbian expatriate sportspeople in Switzerland
Serbian expatriate sportspeople in Romania
Serbian expatriate sportspeople in Russia
Serbian expatriate sportspeople in Turkey
Serbian expatriate sportspeople in Greece
Serbian expatriate sportspeople in Azerbaijan
Serbian expatriate sportspeople in Italy
European champions for Serbia
Universiade medalists in volleyball
Universiade silver medalists for Serbia
Medalists at the 2009 Summer Universiade